The Great Southern and Western Railway (GS&WR) Class 1 (Or perhaps more simply engine numbers 1 to 20) consisted of half of the initial order of 40 passenger locomotives ordered for the GS&WR and which entered service between approximately 1845 and 1847.  The double-frame design was typical of the locomotives Sharp, Stewart and Company of Manchester, England were producing for other railways.

References

2-2-2 locomotives
5 ft 3 in gauge locomotives

Steam locomotives of Ireland
Scrapped locomotives